John Neal Erlenborn (February 8, 1927 – October 30, 2005) was an American lawyer and a former Republican member of the U.S. Congressional Delegations from Illinois, representing the 14th (then after 1980s redistricting the 13th) district.

Born in Chicago, Illinois, Erlenborn attended Immaculate Conception High School (Elmhurst, Illinois), Loyola University Chicago and Loyola University Chicago School of Law. He represented his district for twenty years, from January 1965 to January 1985, a period which began with the 89th U.S. Congress. He retired after serving in the 98th U.S. Congress.

He subsequently became an adjunct faculty member of the Georgetown University Law Center, and served as a board member for the Legal Services Corporation from 1989 to 2001. He died on October 30, 2005, at age 78, after suffering from Lewy body disease. The majority of his papers and other materials created during his time in office are held at the archives of Benedictine University.

External links
Profile, bioguide.congress.gov
Career summary, Stennis Center for Public Service website
Report of death, washingtonpost.com
Profile, ben.edu
 

American legal scholars
Republican Party members of the Illinois House of Representatives
Lawyers from Chicago
Politicians from Chicago
1927 births
2005 deaths
Loyola University Chicago School of Law alumni
Republican Party members of the United States House of Representatives from Illinois
20th-century American politicians
Military personnel from Illinois
20th-century American lawyers
United States Navy personnel of World War II
United States Navy reservists